Languiñeo Department is a  department of Chubut Province in Argentina.

The provincial subdivision has a population of about 3,017 inhabitants in an area of 15,339 km2, and its capital city is Tecka, which is located around 1,899 km from the Capital federal.

Settlements

External links
Map of the Department 

1921 establishments in Argentina
Departments of Chubut Province